The Snowdog Art Trails are a series of public art exhibitions of large Snowdog sculptures, organised by Wild In Art from 2016 to 2018. They celebrate the Snowdog from the 2012 short film, The Snowman and the Snowdog, and feature sculptures painted in a wide variety of styles, many of which reflect the area in which the dogs are displayed. In addition to large fibreglass Snowdogs, the exhibitions have also featured smaller Snowpups, decorated by and, after the event, given to local primary schools.

The trails are supported with maps and apps, allowing visitors to keep track of which Snowdogs they've found. For the Ashford trail, visitors were able to enter codes found by each Snowdog into an app, unlocking rewards such as money off vouchers, free pens and badges.

Aim of the trails

The aim of the trails are to encourage people to explore their local area, spending time in the town or city and perhaps visiting places they wouldn't normally go to. The trails also attract visitors from outside the area, bringing extra money into the local economy. In addition, funds are raised for local hospices by selling merchandise and, at the end of the exhibition, the Snowdogs themselves via auction.

Great North Snowdogs (2016)
Over 50 Snowdogs were created for an art trail which spanned Newcastle and Tyne & Wear. The exhibition ran between 19 September – 20 November 2016 and funds were raised for St Osmond's Hospice. A farewell weekend, with the dogs gathered in one place, was held on 2 December to 4 December, with an auction following on 6 December. The auction raised over £250,000 for the hospice, with two dogs (Disco Dog and Guide Dog) fetching over £9,000 each.

This table shows the lots in the post-exhibition auction of the Great North Snowdogs, together with their hammer price and, if known, where they ended up. Details are taken from the live stream of the auction, which is archived on YouTube.

Snowdogs by the Sea (2016)
While the Great North Snowdogs trail was underway, a second trail was launched at the other end of England in the south coast resort of Brighton and Hove. As with the northern exhibition, snowdogs were placed around the city and they remained there from 24 to 27 September November 2016. A total of 44 Snowdogs and 22 smaller Snowpups were on display. Over 5,000 visitors attended the farewell weekend (held on 4 and 5 December). An auction was held on 6 December in aid of Martlets Hospice in Hove and this raised £337,000. The highest priced dogs were Max, at £22,000 and Boomer, at £20,000.

This table shows the lots in the post-exhibition auction of the Brighton Snowdogs, together with their hammer price and, if known, where they ended up. Details are taken from the Brighton and Hove news website.

Snowdogs Tails in Wales (2017)
The Snowdogs returned for a second year, this time in Cardiff, Wales. A total of 43 Snowdogs were placed around the Welsh capital during the autumn of 2017, with the trail running from 16 September to 26 November. Members of the public were able to view them all together at the farewell weekend of 8 December to 10 December. The dogs were auctioned off on 12 December, with proceeds going to the Tŷ Hafan hospice. A total of £121,000 was raised for the charity, with the highest-earning dogs being Enfys, at £6,100 and Snow Tiger, at £5,100.

This table shows the lots in the post-exhibition auction of the Welsh Snowdogs, together with their hammer price and, if known, where they ended up. Details are taken from the Snowdogs Tails in Wales Facebook page and their main website.

Snowdogs Discover Ashford (2018)

The fourth exhibition saw 35 Snowdogs and 19 Snowpups laid out on a 4-mile trail through and around Ashford, Kent. The exhibition ran from 12 September – 18 November 2018, with a farewell weekend taking place on 1 and 2 December. An auction of the Snowdogs and two Snowpups took place on 3 December, raising £142,000 for Pilgrims Hospices. The highest-selling Snowdogs were Doodle Dog, at £15,000 and Bagdogg, at £9,000.

The 35 Snowdogs include designs based on, amongst others, ash trees, from which Ashford derives its name; a Kentish oast house, the Ashford coat of arms, the infinity symbol (invented by an Ashfordian) and a dog decorated by Mr Doodle.

A protestor caused a local uproar when he launched a successful challenge to the location of Infinity Dog, which was placed in the churchyard of St Mary's Church. The complainant alleged that the dog was not in keeping with the surroundings and, after receiving the complaint, the Registrar of the Ecclesiastical Court ruled the dog be removed. It was relocated nearby, but a successful counter-campaign by the Rev John MacKenzie of the town parish overturned the decision. However, there wasn't enough time to restore the Snowdog to the church as the decision came too close to the end of the trail.

This table shows the lots in the post-exhibition auction of the Ashford Snowdogs, together with their hammer price and, if known, where they ended up. Details are taken from the post-auction catalogue.

References

External links
Snowdog Art Trails website
Snowdogs by the Sea
Great North Snowdogs (via Web Archive)
Snowdogs Tails in Wales
Snowdogs Discover Ashford

 
2016 sculptures
2017 sculptures
2018 sculptures
Sculptures in England
Painted statue public art